Robert Alexander may refer to:

Politics
Robert Alexander (Maryland politician) (1740–1805), loyalist Continental Congressman from Maryland
Robert Alexander (North Carolina politician), 18th Century North Carolina politician
Robert Alexander (Newfoundland politician) (1827–1884), merchant and politician in Newfoundland
Robert Alexander, 16th Baron Cobham (1885–1951), Baron Cobham, British peer
Robert Alexander, Baron Alexander of Weedon (1936–2005), British barrister and Conservative politician
Robert Keith Alexander (1930–2014), Alberta MLA, 1982–1985

Sports
Robert Alexander (American football) (1958–2022), American football running back
Robert Alexander (Irish sportsman) (1910–1943), Irish rugby union and cricket player
Robert A. Alexander (1819–1867), American horse breeder
Robert Alexander (New Zealand cricketer) (1911–1988)

Other
Robert Alexander (United States Army officer) (1863–1941), American major general in World War I
Robert Alexander (philanthropist) (1795–1843), British philanthropist
Robert P. Alexander (1904–1985), collector and expert on Japanese classic postage stamps
Robert Alexander (photographer) (1943–1989), American photographer
Robert J. Alexander (1918–2010), scholar at Rutgers University
Robert McNeill Alexander (1934–2016), British zoologist, and professor at University of Leeds
Robert William Alexander (1905–1979), Irish writer
Robert Alexander (artist) (1840–1923), Scottish artist
Robert Wayne Alexander (born 1941), American biologist

See also
Bob Alexander (disambiguation)